Toyota Team Australia was the name of two allied Australian motor racing teams. One competed in the Australian Touring Car Championship between 1985 and 1990. The other was a rally team in the Australian Rally Championship that competed from 1988 and continues today the identity of Neal Bates Motorsport as a historic rally team.

History
Toyota Team Australia was founded in 1985 as the factory team of Toyota. The team competed in the under two litre category of the Australian Touring Car Championship with Sprinters and Corollas winning the category in most years. 

In 1989 the team commenced competing in the outright class with a Supra, however because of the weight regulations of the time was not competitive. The team closed at the end of 1990, although much of the team's personnel and equipment were reassembled by lead driver John Smith for the 1991 and 1992 Bathurst 1000s.

References

Australian auto racing teams
Auto racing teams established in 1985
Auto racing teams disestablished in 1990
Sports teams in Victoria (Australia)
Sports teams in the Australian Capital Territory
1985 establishments in Australia
1990 disestablishments in Australia
Toyota in motorsport